Panos Michalopoulos (born 15 January 1949) is a Greek actor, who has appeared during the last three decades in movies and television series.

Selected filmography

Films
Iphigenia (1977)
Enas kontos tha mas sosei (1981)
Garsoniera gia deka (1981)
Ta Tsakalia (1981)
Vasika kalispera sas (1982)
I Strofi (1982)
Peraste, filiste, teliosate! (1986)
Roz gatos (1986)
Pano kato ke plagios (1993)

Television
 Vaincre à Olympie (1977)
Fovos kai pathos (1990)
Tmima ithon (1992)
Pirasmos (1995)
Palirroia (1996)
Dada gia oles tis douleies (1998)
Gia mia gynaika kai ena aftokinito (2001)
Ta Filarakia (2002)
I Ora i kali (2004)
Ta koritsia tou baba (2007)
S'agapao...parkare  (2009)

External links

1949 births
Living people
Greek male film actors
Greek male stage actors
Greek male television actors
People from Kalamata
20th-century Greek male actors
21st-century Greek male actors